Tse Tak Him (born 10 February 1985 in Hong Kong) is a Hong Kong professional footballer who currently plays as a goalkeeper for Hong Kong Premier League club Southern.

Club career

Citizen

During the 2010–11 Hong Kong Senior Challenge Shield final against defending champions South China, Tse saved a penalty by Chan Siu Ki in the match, another one by Li Haiqiang in the penalty shoot-out, and helped the team win the match by 7:5 on penalties.

In 2014 Lunar New Year Cup, Tse led Citizen Cuenca United to defeat Russian Premier League club Krylia Sovetov in the semi-finals. He saved a penalty and won the match by 4–2. Citizen Cuenca United finally became the champions.

Southern 
Tse joined Southern in 2015 on 9 July. His contract was renewed in July 2017.

Honours

Club
Citizen
Hong Kong Senior Shield: 2010–11

Individual
Hong Kong First Division League Best Youth Player: 2004–05, 2005–06

Career statistics

Club 
As of 20 May 2021

International

Hong Kong
As of 14 December 2019

Hong Kong U-23
As of 28 September 2010

References

External links

Tse Tak Him at HKFA

1985 births
Living people
Hong Kong footballers
Association football goalkeepers
Hong Kong First Division League players
Hong Kong Premier League players
Citizen AA players
TSW Pegasus FC players
Southern District FC players
Hong Kong international footballers
Footballers at the 2006 Asian Games
Asian Games competitors for Hong Kong
Hong Kong League XI representative players